Corydalis filistipes is perennial flowering plant found only on Ulleung Island in North Gyeongsang Province, South Korea. It is listed as vulnerable on the IUCN Red List of Threatened Species.

Description
2-3 Stem leaf split up 3 times, 2-3 pieces. First leaf split into 3 pieces. Lobe is acute phase and split into 3 pieces or Final lobe form is lance or line lance and surface is green. The back side is grayish blue.

Blooming occurs in May. Structure of Corolla or calyx protruding backward is 5mm long. The bract is a lanceolate shape with a length of 1–3 cm, but it gradually becomes smaller. The Peduncle (botany) is 3–8 cm long and has no hair.

Fruit is flat, lanceolate, narrow end, 1.8–2 cm long, with a Stigma (botany) on the end. The seed is 3mm long and has no hairs, black streak, and white spotted head.

There is one main stem and 2 ~ 3 scales at the bottom, among which the large scales are 2.5 – 4 cm long and the lower part covers the main stem.

Diameter of tuber is 2 ~ 3 cm and yellow.

Uses 
Tubers used by medicinal, but rare. Root tuber of Corydalis yanhusuo, Corydalis turtschaninovii for. Fumariaefolia, Corydalis ambigua, Corydalis filistipes, Corydalis ternata, Corydalis turtschaninovii var. linearis is called Corydalis turtschaninowii and used by medicinal.

Extracted alkaloid by tuber is almost 11. corydaline, tetrahydropalmatine, conadine, protopine, tetrahydrocoptisine, isocorypalmine, corybulbine, β-homochelidonene, coptisine, dehydrocorydaline, l-coryclamine, dehydrocorydalmine

It has efficacy such as analgesia, soothing, calming, and contraction of the uterus, helps blood circulation, and relieves bruise. Diseases such as dysmenorrhea, menstrual irregularities, abdominal pain due to postpartum hemorrhage, complications of postpartum hemorrhage, back and knee pain, bruising, and bruising are some of the common diseases.

References 

filistipes
Flora of South Korea